Clinocera may refer to:
 Clinocera (fly), a genus of flies in the family Empididae
 Clinocera Reitter, 1906, a genus of beetles in the family Tetratomidae, synonym of Orchesia
 Clinocera Deyrolle, 1864, a genus of beetles in the family Buprestidae, synonym of Paragrilus